Jenny McDonough (born 23 April 1981), also known as Jenny McAuley, is a former Ireland women's field hockey international. Between 2001 and 2009 she made 117 senior appearances for Ireland. She has also played for Belfast Harlequins in the Women's Irish Hockey League.

Early years, family and education
McDonough was raised in the Malone Road district of Belfast. Both of her parents were dentists. She began playing field hockey at Stranmillis Primary School. Between 1991 and 1999 she attended Methodist College Belfast. Between 1999 and 2003 she attended Newcastle University where she gained a BA in Accountancy  and Law. Between 2007 and 2008 McDonough completed a Bachelor of Laws through the Open University.

Domestic teams

Early years
In her youth McDonough played for Methodist College Belfast and Collegians. She also represented Newcastle University at intervarsity level.

Belfast Harlequins
McDonough has played for Belfast Harlequins in the Women's Irish Hockey League. In 2015 she announced she was retiring from the first team due to work and family commitments. However she subsequently made a come back at the start of the 2017–18 season. Her team mates at Harlequins have included Zoe Wilson and Lizzie Colvin.

Ireland international
McDonough represented Ireland at Under-16, Under-18 and Under-21 levels before making her senior debut in 2001, aged 19, against England. Between 2001 and 2009 she made 117 senior appearances for Ireland.

Personal

Employment
Between February 2009 and August 2016 McDonough worked as an editor/director of Offshore Investment Magazine. In August 2016 she began working as a development officer at Queen's University Belfast.

Family
McDonough is married and has two children, Rebecca and Matthew.

References

1981 births
Living people
Ireland international women's field hockey players
Female field hockey players from Northern Ireland
Irish female field hockey players
British female field hockey players
Belfast Harlequins field hockey players
Women's Irish Hockey League players
Sportspeople from Belfast
People educated at Methodist College Belfast
Alumni of Newcastle University
Alumni of the Open University
People associated with Queen's University Belfast